Nemastomatales is an order of red algae. It includes some members of the defunct order Cryptonemiales.

References

Red algae orders
Florideophyceae